Neptune's Pride is a 2010 browser-based 4X video game, created by Australian studio Iron Helmet Games.

Production
Neptune's Pride was partially designed by Penny Sweetser, whose doctoral thesis focused on emergent play as a design strategy.

Gameplay
Players can produce, research, explore, and colonize star systems. The goal of the game is to capture more stars than other players; a game can last for up to a month, with events progressing while players are logged out. Diplomacy is an important part of the game, with alliance-building and betrayal of allies playing a major role.

Reception
PC Gamer UK named Neptune's Pride as Webgame of the Year.

In 2011, it was listed in the book 1001 Video Games You Must Play Before You Die.

References

External links

2010 video games
Browser-based multiplayer online games
4X video games
Space trading and combat simulators
Video games developed in Australia